Sehba Hussain is an Indian social activist. She is the co-founder  and honorary treasurer of Self-Employed Women's Association (SEWA) in Lucknow. and founding board member and executive director of  Lucknow-based, BETI (Better Education Through Innovation) Foundation, established in 2000.

Early life and education
Sehba Hussain was born in Lucknow, Uttar Pradesh.

She did her post graduate studies from University of Pennsylvania, Philadelphia, as a Fulbright Scholar, and also did her master's degree in medical and psychiatric social work from University of Delhi.

Career
Sehba Hussain has worked with UNICEF for nearly 17 years, both as an international and national professional, notable among which were her responsibilities as Country Representative Bhutan, chief of Health Section, UNICEF India, and Chief Upper India Office responsible for Bihar and Uttar Pradesh and state representative, U.P.

She co-founded SEWA, Lucknow, along with Runa Banerjee in 1984, which has been involved in organising women engaged in chikankari industry. It was given the 2006 Best Practices Award by UN-HABITAT. In 2000, she became a founding member of BETI Foundation, established in Lucknow and working in the areas of Bahraich, Balrampur, Barabanki, Gonda, Kheri, Lalitpur, Lucknow, Shravasti, Sitapur.

She was a member of the National Advisory Council during the tenure of 2005-2008.

She is also a member of the executive committee of the National Mission for the Sarva Shiksha Abhiyan, for universalization of elementary education in India.

References

External links
 BETI Foundation, website

Indian women activists
Living people
Indian Muslims
Businesspeople from Lucknow
Delhi University alumni
University of Pennsylvania alumni
Members of National Advisory Council, India
Social workers
Activists from Uttar Pradesh
Women educators from Uttar Pradesh
Educators from Uttar Pradesh
Social workers from Uttar Pradesh
Scholars from Lucknow
Businesswomen from Uttar Pradesh
Year of birth missing (living people)